Rosser Goodman is an American film and television director, writer and producer. Goodman founded her own production company, KGB Films in the 90's upon moving to Hollywood. Goodman's company is now called Circle Content in partnership with fashion designer and costume designer Oneita Parker.

Personal life
Born in Washington, D.C., Goodman grew up acting and singing in the theater. At an early age, she was enrolled in advance drama classes at the Columbia Center for Theatrical Arts founded by Toby Orenstein. In high school,  Goodman's creative writing, social commentary and character studies flourished at The Park School of Baltimore. Goodman then graduated a year early from the honors college New College of Florida to attend film graduate school at Temple University's Anthropology Film Center in Santa Fe, New Mexico.  From there Goodman got her first big break working on NBC Television's Earth 2, produced by Steven Spielberg and his production company Amblin Entertainment. Goodman is openly lesbian.

Career
Early in Rosser's career, she wrote, directed, and produced several award-winning digital shorts. Each received worldwide acclaim screening at film festivals worldwide including Mix New York and Immaginaria. Consequently, record label executive, Nicole Ehrlich, tapped Rosser to direct a rock-n-roll documentary entitled Dropped, an exposé on failed bands signed by record labels. The project was purchased by the Sundance TV.

Rosser went on to direct and produce Holding Trevor. A darkly comedic, coming of age film. Regent Releasing nabbed the film at its first Los Angeles festival premiere. Regent delivered a U.S. theatrical release and bought all North American rights. Additionally, the film sold in Western Europe. Regent Entertainment eventually bought the worldwide rights. Dennis Harvey at Variety said "director Rosser Goodman delivers a polished product with solid tech values." At the Los Angeles Times, Kevin Thomas said "Director Rosser Goodman makes the crucial decisions facing Trevor suspenseful and involving -- and tinged with humor as well as pathos."

Goodman directed and produced the hilarious and heartwarming romantic comedy, Love or Whatever, released by TLA in the United States and Europe, in 2014.

The Hollywood Reporter honored Goodman as one of the "Five in Focus" film directors.  Goodman won multiple audience awards for her films including the Berlin Lesbian Festival and the Freiberg Lesbian film Festival. Her original script, Mongoose8, won the Panasonic Filmmakers' Award.

Goodman's work has received distribution through Bildkraft, CFMDC, HERE! TV, Netflix, Optimal, PBS, Peccadillo Pictures, Regent Releasing, Sundance TV, TLA, Wolfe Video, Hulu, Dekkoo, and world film festivals such as Frameline, ImageOut,  Feminale,  MadCat, Mezipatra, Outfest, Mix Mexico, Mix Brazil, and Verzaubert to name only a few.

Goodman was selected as one of 50 Women Changing Hollywood.

In 2015, she was honored by the MSE foundation with an award for lifetime achievement. Presently, Goodman serves on the Board for Women of Color Unite/The JTC List and NAMIC-Southern California. She is a member of the Alliance of Women Directors.

Filmography

As Cinematographer
 1999 - Wet Dress
 2000 - Life's a Butch!
 2002 - Daddy-O
 2003 - Drama
 2004 - Pain
 2005 - That's What I'm Talkin' 'Bout

See also
 List of female film and television directors
 List of lesbian filmmakers
 List of LGBT-related films directed by women

References

External links

Living people
American film producers
American women film directors
American women film producers
American lesbian artists
LGBT film directors
LGBT television directors
LGBT producers
Film directors from Washington, D.C.
Screenwriters from Washington, D.C.
New College of Florida alumni
Temple University alumni
Year of birth missing (living people)
21st-century American women artists
American women television directors
American television directors